This is a list of people who have served as Vice-Admiral of Lincolnshire.

Robert Dymoke in 1565
Henry Clinton, Lord Clinton bef. 1569 – aft. 1576 (also Vice-Admiral of Yorkshire, 1578–1583)
Sir Edmund Carey 1585 – aft. 1587
vacant
Sir Clement Cotterell 1620–1631
Robert Bertie, 1st Earl of Lindsey 1631–1642
vacant
Edward Ayscough 1647–1649 (Parliamentary)
vacant
Sir Henry Vane 1651–1660 (Parliamentary)
George Saunderson, 5th Viscount Castleton 1660–1702
Thomas Saunderson 1702–1705
James Saunderson, 1st Earl Castleton 1705–1723
vacant
John Cust, 1st Earl Brownlow 1809–1853
Charles Anderson-Pelham, 2nd Earl of Yarborough 1854–1862

References
Institute of Historical Research

Military ranks of the United Kingdom
Lincolnshire
Vice Admiral
Military history of Lincolnshire